The Australian Commercial Television Industry Code of Practice is a self-regulatory code adopted by free-to-air broadcasters in the Australian media. Although developed by industry, the code has been registered (as the regulatory regime permits) with the Australian Communications and Media Authority (ACMA).

The Code was developed by Free TV Australia, an industry body which represents Australia's commercial free-to-air broadcast networks and stations and is put under review triennially.

Description
FreeTV Australia's website describes the Code as being an attempt "to balance and provide for the various and often conflicting interests of our diverse society in the delivery of commercial television services. It is the result of extensive consultation with Government advisory bodies, community interest groups and the public generally."

Commercial television networks in Australia are required to comply with the Australian Commercial Television Code of Practice, which is governed by the Australian Communications and Media Authority with Free TV Australia mediating between the networks and the ACMA, as well as handling viewer complaints. Classifications for each programme broadcast on TV, are decided upon by trained classification officers at each network. If viewers believe a network has breached the TV Code of Practice (an incorrect classification have been given, for example), viewers can submit a complaint to Free TV Australia, who then submit that complaint to the network. If viewers are dissatisfied with the result, they may then refer their complaint to the ACMA for an investigation.

Content
The Code covers the matters prescribed in section 123 of the Broadcasting Services Act 1992 and other matters relating to program content that are of concern to the community including:
 program classifications;
 accuracy, fairness and respect for privacy in news and current affairs;
 advertising time on television; and
 placement of commercials and program promotions and complaints handling.

The Code operates alongside the ACMA Standards which regulates programs for children and the Australian content of programs and advertisements.

Television content rating system

Child-specific ratings 

These time zones are further governed by the Australian Commercial Television Code of Practice, over and above the commercial Code of Practice. Both are similar to the G and PG classifications respectively in terms of allowable content, but are specifically targeted at children, whereas G specifies programming content that is suitable for all audiences, but may not necessarily be of interest to children. Until 2020, commercial free-to-air stations were obligated to broadcast a set number of hours of content per year. These quotas were removed in October 2020, leaving broadcasters with no requirement to air programmes specifically aimed at children.

Standard ratings 
The Australian television content rating system is intended to be equivalent to the Australian Classification Board (ACB) classifications, albeit with some minor alterations. They're usually presented with the same shape and sometimes colour as their ACB counterparts. The two government-owned TV networks, ABC and SBS, are not bound by the same regulations as their commercial counterparts, and are instead each bound by their own Codes of Practice. The guidelines provided by these Codes are similar but not identical to the Codes of Practice for commercial stations. For example, SBS refers to the rating MAV 15+ instead of AV 15+, while ABC does not use the AV/MAV rating at all; instead programs rated MA 15+ must not start before 9:30 p.m., instead of 9:00 p.m. While the ABC recognizes the G rating, its code of practice does not require that it display its classification symbol on-air in respect to G-rated programming.

Pay television networks also have a different system to the free-to-air networks. In general, all content on pay TV must still be given one of the above ratings; however, there are not usually restrictions on the time of day any particular programming can be broadcast. There is no R 18+ rating for pay TV, but its use is strictly limited to special interest channels. FOXTEL, a pay TV company, has a parental lock-out system which can be programmed by parents to stop children from seeing certain programmes. In 2009, the system malfunctioned, allowing children access to violent TV shows and films. The restrictions on R 18+ rated programming have been increased since then, and those programmes can now only be shown on the two adult channels.

From December 2015, the ACMA introduced sweeping changes to the ratings system for commercial networks. Among them were allowing M and MA 15+ programmes to air an hour earlier then they were previously allowed, from 7:30 pm and 8:30 pm respectively, PG programmes can air all day, dissolving the AV 15+ classification, as well as changes to when adverts with higher classifications programme can air. R 18+ and X 18+ restricted classifications are not permitted for free-to-air broadcast in Australia. Many R 18+ movies on DVD/Blu-ray are often edited on Free TV/cable networks, to secure an MA 15+ classification or lower. Some movies that were classified R 18+ on DVD have since been aired on Australian TV with an MA 15+ classification.

Adult "Pay Per View" only

Consumer advice 
Consumer advice is compulsory for all MA 15+ and one-off programmes, as well as very short series classified M or higher (such as feature films, miniseries and documentaries). Commercial networks have been providing consumer advice to all PG and M programmes anyway. From February 2019, the Nine Network, the Seven Network, Network 10, SBS and Foxtel along with regional networks Prime7, GWN7, WIN Television, NBN Television no longer uses full-screen and voiced-over boards before the beginning of a programme, instead would opt for a small text box in the bottom right-hand corner (Nine & WIN) and top left-hand corner (SBS, GWN7, Prime7, Seven & 10). Though ABC and some Foxtel channels continue to use full-screen and voiced-over boards before the start of a programme.

Consumer advice takes the form of a full-screen written and verbal announcement at the start of the programme, announcing the classification as well as listing the type and strength and/or frequency of any classifiable element. When a programme carries consumer advice, appropriate abbreviations in letter form are displayed along with the classification symbol after each commercial break. They also usually appear in programming guides, usually in lower case to distinguish from primary classifications. In general, these abbreviations are as follows:

 A – used for programs with adult themes;
strong adult themes
medical procedures 
crude humour
sexual violence
suicide themes 
war scenes
 V – used for programs depicting violence;
stylised violence
mild violence
some violence
frequent violence
realistic violence
strong violence
 L – used for programs coarse language;
mild coarse language
some coarse language
frequent coarse language
very coarse language
frequent very coarse language
 S – used for programs depicting simulated sex scenes and/or references;
sexual references
a sex scene
sex scenes
strong sex scenes 
 H – used for programs containing horror or supernatural themes;
 D – used for programs with drug references and/or use;
drug references
drug use 
 N – used for programs containing nudity;

Previously, abbreviations such as MP (medical procedures) and SN (supernatural themes) have been used.

Notes

See also
Advertising Standards Bureau (Australia)
Australian Classification Board

Broadcasting in Australia
Media content ratings systems
Entertainment rating organizations
Australian classification system
Censorship in Australia